Jarabo is a surname. Notable people with the surname include: 

Altaír Jarabo (born 1986), Mexican actress and model
José María Jarabo (1923–1959), Spanish spree killer
José Neira Jarabo (1906-1941), Spanish anarchist
Ronny Jarabo (born 1944), Puerto Rican politician

See also
Alberto Jarabo Payá, Spanish lawyer and politician